Ece Hocaoğlu (born March 5, 1994 in Bursa, Turkey) is a Turkish female volleyball player. Currently, she plays for Beşiktaş Women's Volleyball in Istanbul. In the 2011-12 season, she was with Nilüfer Belediyespor in her hometown. Hocaoğlu is a member of the Turkey women's youth national volleyball team, and wears number 10.

Her elder sister Tuğçe Hocaoğlu (born 1988) is also a professional volleyball player.

Clubs
  Ankara VakıfBank (2006-2009)
  TVF Sport High School (2009-2011)
  Nilüfer Belediyespor (2011-2012)
  Beşiktaş Women's Volleyball Team (2012-2013)

Awards

Individual
 *2011 CEV Girls Youth Volleyball European Championship - Most Valuable Player

National team
2011 European Youth Summer Olympic Festival - 
2011 FIVB Girls Youth World Championship - 
2011 CEV Girls Youth Volleyball European Championship - 
2012 Women's Junior European Volleyball Championship -

See also
 Turkish women in sports

References

1994 births
Sportspeople from Bursa
Living people
Turkish women's volleyball players
Nilüfer Belediyespor volleyballers
Beşiktaş volleyballers